Tusseyville is a small unincorporated community in Centre County, Pennsylvania, United States. It is in west-central Potter Township, just north of U.S. Route 322 in the Penns Valley near Centre Hall.

References

Unincorporated communities in Centre County, Pennsylvania
Unincorporated communities in Pennsylvania